The flag of Brittany, a region in the northwest of France, is called the Gwenn-ha-du, pronounced , which means white and black, in Breton (French blanc et noir). The flag was designed in 1923 by Morvan Marchal. It is also unofficially used in the department of Loire-Atlantique, although this now belongs to the Pays de la Loire and not to the region of Brittany, as the territory of Loire-Atlantique is historically part of the province of Brittany. Nantes, its prefecture, was once one of the two capital cities of Brittany.

Overview
The flag is the official banner of the region of Brittany. It is a symbol of the Breton identity used by Bretons in and outside of Brittany. For years the authorities considered the flag as a separatist symbol, but the attitude has now changed and the flag, no longer having any political connotations, may appear everywhere, even on public buildings, along with the other official flags. It is widely used throughout Brittany and can even be seen on town halls in the region. Because of the absence of legislation concerning regional flags in France the flag is also flown on sailing boats and fishing boats. The design of the ermine spots varies as there is no official description, but although the number is also not specified, in flags produced since the 1970s, the canton virtually always contains exactly 11 spots.

The flag was created in 1923 by Morvan Marchal. He used the flag of the United States as his inspiration, seen as a symbol of freedom.

The nine horizontal stripes represent the traditional dioceses of Brittany into which the duchy was divided historically. The five black stripes represent the French or Gallo speaking dioceses of Dol, Nantes, Rennes, Saint-Malo and Saint-Brieuc; the four white stripes represent the Breton-speaking dioceses of Trégor, Léon, Cornouaille and Vannes. The ermine canton recalls the arms of the Duchy of Brittany.

The flag first came to the notice of a wider public at the Exposition Internationale des Arts Décoratifs et Industriels Modernes in Paris in 1925. It was adopted by various cultural and nationalist groups through the 1920s and 1930s. However its association with nationalist and separatist groups during the Second World War brought suspicions of collaboration to the flag. A revival of interest in the flag took place in the 1960s. Since then it has mostly lost an association with separatism in the mind of the public and become a widely accepted symbol for all Brittany and Bretons. The older ermine field flag and black cross continue to be used, though rarely, by some individuals and groups.

The blazon of the flag is Sable four bars argent, a canton ermine. Traditionally coats of arms could be displayed as a rectangular banner as well as on a shield.

Gallery

See also
List of Breton flags

Bibliography

References

Brittany
Brittany
Brittany, Flag of
Breton nationalism
Brittany